Ruottala  is a village in the municipality of Keminmaa and Tornio in Lapland in north-western Finland. For few years there was a motor event during summer every second year called "Oikea Moottoritapahtuma", which was arranged by a club called Konevoimayhdistys.

External links
Satellite map at Maplandia

Villages in Finland
Keminmaa
Tornio